Nanyuki Airfield is an airport in Nanyuki, Kenya.

Location
Nanyuki Airfield, is in Nanyuki, Laikipia County, in the Kenyan East Rift Valley.

Located on the western foothills of Mount Kenya, it lies only , south of the Equator.

Overview

Nanyuki Airfield is a government-owned, privately leased airfield, serving private and commercial air operators. The airfield handles mostly small, light, single-engine aircraft and some twin engined aircraft. Most traffic through Nanyuki is routed from Nairobi, carrying tourists to Mara Serena Airport, Samburu Airport, Laikipia, Lewa and Meru. The airfield is leased by Tropic Air Kenya, offering air charter and helicopter services.

Airlines and destinations

Services
Nanyuki Airfield is open from 6 am to 6 pm daily, with all traffic reporting to the Nanyuki air traffic controller. Aircraft fuel is usually available. Barney's Restaurant is open from 8 am to 5 pm daily, serving hot and cold drinks, breakfast, lunch and snacks. The gift shop is also open daily, selling African arts, crafts and gifts.

History and development
In the late 1960s, the Nanyuki Airfield was originally along the Nanyuki – Rumuruti Road. This was a grass airfield, mainly used by small, single-engine, privately owned aircraft. During the 1970s the site was purchased by the Kenya government for military and official business and named the Laikipia Air Base.

At the time, it was almost entirely used by privately owned small, light, single-engine aircraft. The site comprised a tarmac runway and a caretaker's hut.

In the early 1990s, the airfield became home to Tropic Air Kenya – a small air charter company operating single-engine Cessna aircraft and helicopters. It is also a key airport for Air Kenya, East African Safari Air, and Fly540 who operate daily scheduled services linking with Nairobi, Lewa, Laikipia, Samburu, Meru and the Maasai Mara.

Offices and facilities have been built. To accommodate the many thousands of passengers that pass through the airfield each year, Tropic Air Kenya established a waiting area, with a restaurant, shop and toilet facilities.

See also
 Nanyuki
 Laikipia County
 Rift Valley Province
 Kenya Airports Authority
 Kenya Civil Aviation Authority
 List of airports in Kenya

References

External links
 Location of Nanyuki Airport at Google Maps
 Website of Kenya Airports Authority
 List of Airports in Kenya
 Airkenya Routes

Airports in Kenya
Airports in Rift Valley Province
Laikipia County